A Briquet Griffon Vendéen is a breed of hunting dog originating in France.  Prior to the first World War it was bred down in size by the Comte d’Elva from the Grand Griffon Vendéen. The Briquet Griffon Vendéen was almost extinct after World War II, but thanks to the effort of Hubert Dezamy, a French dog show judge, the breed was restored.

Appearance
The Briquet Griffon Vendéen has a short head, low-set ears and a bushy double coat.  It comes in solid or mixed colors, fawn, light brown, white and orange, white and gray and even tri-colored. They stand from 20 - 22 inches at the withers.  They weigh from 48 to 53 lbs.

Temperament 
The Briquet is a passionate hunter with stamina and fortitude. It should be able to pick up a cold trail as well as a hot one. Like its close relations the other vendeen hounds, the Briquet relishes its time outdoors with its family. While they are not high-strung, they are lively and enthusiastic dogs. Bred to work in packs as well as on their own, they get along well with other dogs and are not overly possessive about anything. They are fine companion for children.

Griffons do not particularly take to being told what to do. They do not mind being cajoled, bribed, or played with- and if these things lead them to do something their owner likes, then everyone is happy.

Exercise 
All the Griffons are keen hunters with strong instincts. They thrive on being able to follow their noses at least once a day. Provided with a large, safe area in which to sniff and explore to its heart's content, a Briquette will be a very happy dog- even if it is just once a week. Short of hunting opportunities, Griffons must have time outdoors. Long walks are most appreciated- bred as hunting dogs, they do not tire easily.

Grooming 
The tousled appearance of the Griffon comes naturally, and any trimming is highly discouraged. Its double coat must be brushed and combed. The burrs and mud it picks up in its travels need to be brushed off its legs and belly. Its long ears can harbor infection and should be cleaned regularly.

See also
 Dogs portal
 List of dog breeds

References
"Briquet Griffon Vendéen" FCI-Standard N° 19, 18 February 2000 Fédération Cynologique Internationale (World Canine Federation) standard;
Choron, Sandra and Choron, Harry (2005) Planet Dog: A Doglopedia Houghton Mifflin Books, Boston,  p. 180;

External links
Club du Griffon Vendéen - In french

FCI breeds
Scent hounds
Dog breeds originating in France